Società Sportiva Dilettante Centobuchi is an Italian association football club located in Centobuchi, a frazione of Monteprandone, Marche. It currently plays in Serie D. Its colors are white and blue.

External links
Official homepage
Centobuchi page et Serie-D.com

Football clubs in Italy
Association football clubs established in 1912
Football clubs in the Marche
1912 establishments in Italy